Jack White (9 July 1893 – 6 November 1968) was an English cricketer. White was a right-handed batsman who bowled right-arm fast. He was born at Putney, London.

While studying at the University of Cambridge, White played two first-class matches for the university cricket club, both against Yorkshire at Fenner's in 1913 and 1914. In his first match he took what would be his only first-class five wicket haul with figures of 5/75 in Yorkshire's first-innings of the match. He later played a single first-class match for Surrey against Oxford University at The Oval in 1926, though without success.

He died at East Grinstead, Sussex on 6 November 1968.

References

External links
Jack White at ESPNcricinfo
Jack White at CricketArchive

1893 births
1968 deaths
People from Putney
Alumni of the University of Cambridge
English cricketers
Cambridge University cricketers
Surrey cricketers